Channing Hill (born August 22, 1987 in Grand Island, Nebraska) is an American jockey in American Thoroughbred horse racing.

Hill began riding horses when he was 16 years old. He rode full-time at Prairie Meadows Racetrack between his junior and senior years in high school. After graduating from Columbus High School in 2005 he traveled to New York to continue his riding career. His father is longtime jockey Allan Hill who rode at Fonner Park during his four decade long racing career.

In 2005, Hill was the runner-up to Emma-Jayne Wilson in the Eclipse Award for Outstanding Apprentice Jockey voting. His first win was atop Red River Ridge in June 2004 at Prairie Meadows Racetrack. Hill currently rides for the New York and New Jersey racing circuit. Presently, and in the past few years he has been in the top 100 list for North American Racing Leaders with overall earnings and wins.

On July 10, 2010 Hill swept the two $75,000 stakes races on the 75th Anniversary Day program at Suffolk Downs in front of a crowd of 10,310.

Personal life
Channing Hill is married to Shelbi Catalano, daughter of horse trainer Wayne Catalano.

Year-end charts

References

1987 births
Living people
American jockeys
People from Grand Island, Nebraska